Devcom or DEVCOM may stand for:
The College of Development Communication of the University of the Philippines Los Baños
The United States Army Combat Capabilities Development Command